"When Somebody Loves You" is a song written by Johnny Neel and Rick Giles, and recorded by American country music group Restless Heart.  It was released in September 1990 as the third single from the album Fast Movin' Train.  The song reached number 21 on the Billboard Hot Country Singles & Tracks chart, becoming their first single since "Let the Heartache Ride" not to reach Top 10.

Chart performance

References

1990 singles
Restless Heart songs
Songs written by Rick Giles
Song recordings produced by Scott Hendricks
RCA Records Nashville singles
Songs written by Johnny Neel
1990 songs